Ambling Books was a privately held online company that offered free and paid DRM-free audiobooks for download and audio book player software for computers and mobile devices. Ambling was also a distribution channel for audiobook publishers. The company went out of business in February 2016.

History 
 Nov. 2008  iBookTreasures.com begins development phase
 Feb. 2009  Company is incorporated by owner Howard Davis as iBookTreasures, LLC
 July 2010  Launched AmblingBooks.com as a distribution channel for audiobooks
 Jan 2011  Release Ambling BookPlayer for Windows
 Mar. 2011  Released Ambling BookPlayer for the Mac
 July 2011  Released Ambling BookPlayer for the iPhone, iPad, and iPod Touch
 February 2016  Ambling Books shuts down

Websites

AmblingBooks.com 
In July 2010, Ambling Audio Books launched AmblingBooks.com as a "publisher-friendly" distribution channel for audio book publishers. Website offered access to over 10,000 free and discounted audio books from publishers including Simon & Schuster, Blackstone Audio, BBC Audiobooks, Tantor Audio, and LibriVox.

AmblingBookPlayer.com 
In August 2009, the AmblingBookPlayer.com site was launched offering specialized audiobook playing software called the Ambling BookPlayer. This software, initially created for Android devices, offered several benefits over existing MP3 players:
 Automatic file handling (listeners interact with multiple MP3 files as a single book).
 Chapter-based, instead of file-based navigation.
 Extensive bookmarking and note-making capabilities.
 Series-based library organization (titles in a series are ordered by chronological date, not alphabetically).
 Automatic bookmark history prevents listeners from losing their place.
 Sleep timer stops the audio book playback during nighttime listening.
The Ambling BookPlayer application supports both wired and wireless downloading of audio books from AmblingBooks.com.

The Ambling BookPlayer has received high ratings from users of the application.

References

External links 
 Ambling Audio Books - Audio book and book player download site
 Ambling BookPlayer - Book player application information and user forums

Audiobook companies and organizations
American book websites
Online retailers of the United States
Accessible information
Blindness equipment
Privately held companies based in Utah
2009 establishments in Utah
Internet properties established in 2009
Defunct online companies of the United States